The 2020 Gardner–Webb Runnin' Bulldogs football team represented Gardner–Webb University in the 2020–21 NCAA Division I FCS football season. They were led by first-year head coach Tre Lamb and played their home games at Ernest W. Spangler Stadium. They were members of the Big South Conference.

Previous season

The Runnin' Bulldogs finished the 2019 season 3–9, 1–5 in Big South play to finish in a three-way tie for fifth place.

Preseason

Polls
In June 2020, the Runnin' Bulldogs were predicted to finish sixth in the Big South by a panel of media and head coaches.

Schedule
Gardner–Webb originally had games scheduled against Georgia Tech, Hampton and Monmouth, but they were canceled  due to each school's decision to cancel fall sports due to the COVID-19 pandemic.

References

Gardner-Webb
Gardner–Webb Runnin' Bulldogs football seasons
Gardner-Webb Runnin' Football